is a street dog in Istanbul, Turkey, known for regularly riding on the city's public transport. He is described as being an "Anatolian shepherd mix" and having "golden-brown fur, dark eyes and floppy ears". He makes use of buses, metro trains, trams, and ferries.

City officials arranged for him to be vaccinated, and be fitted with a microchip  which enables them to track where he has been. On one occasion he reached the Princes' Islands.

His name is the Turkish word for bogie.

His adventures first came to public notice in mid 2021. A spokesperson for Metro Istanbul said:

A Twitter account is operated in 's name, with tweets in Turkish and English, and with almost 60,000 followers as of 6 October 2021. There is also an Instagram account. Many people post pictures of him, or selfies with him, to their own social media channels.

Boji was adopted by Ömer Koç in 2022.

References 

Individual dogs
Public transport in Istanbul
2021 in Istanbul